VOZ may refer to:
 Virgin Australia airline ICAO code
 IATA airport code for Voronezh International Airport

See also
 La Voz (disambiguation)